Blatten is a village and municipality in the Lötschental valley in the canton of Valais in Switzerland. It is part of the district of Westlich Raron, and much of the municipality lies within the Jungfrau-Aletsch protected area, a World Heritage Site. Besides the village of Blatten, the municipality includes the settlements of Eisten, Fafleralp, Ried and Weissenried.

History
Blatten is first mentioned in 1433 as uffen der Blattun.

The blazon of the municipal coat of arms is Azure, a rocky Mountain Argent issuant from the flank dexter and from the point, per bendwise and in chief sinister a Cross bottony of the same.

Geography
Blatten lies in the Lötschental valley south of the Bernese Alps. It consists of the village of Blatten and the hamlets of Eisten, Ried and Weissenried. At the head of the road up the valley, Fafleralp is the site of a well known hotel.

The Jungfrau-Aletsch protected area, includes most of the municipality, although excluding the main settlements. At the head of the Lötschental valley, the Lötschenlücke pass, into the valley of the Aletsch Glacier, forms the municipal boundary. Below this pass, the Langgletscher glacier occupies the Lötschental valley, whilst the Schwarzsee lake lies at a lower level. The valley is framed by the Tschingelhorn to the north and the Bietschhorn to the south, and the slopes of both mountains lie within the municipality.

Of this area, 9.5% is used for agricultural purposes, while 9.0% is forested. Of the rest of the land, 0.4% is settled (buildings or roads) and 81.1% is unproductive land.

The entire village of Blatten and the hamlets of Eisten and Weissenried are designated as part of the Inventory of Swiss Heritage Sites.

Demographics

, the population was 51.9% male and 48.1% female. The population was made up of 158 Swiss men (50.3% of the population) and 5 (1.6%) non-Swiss men. There were 147 Swiss women (46.8%) and 4 (1.3%) non-Swiss women. 2.5% of the population were resident foreign nationals. Of the population in the municipality, 224 or about 79.7% were born in Blatten and lived there in 2000.  There were 36 or 12.8% who were born in the same canton, while 19 or 6.8% were born somewhere else in Switzerland, and 1 or 0.4% were born outside of Switzerland.

, most of the population spoke German (280 or 99.6%) as their first language with the rest speaking English. Children and teenagers (0–19 years old) made up 17.8% of the population, while adults (20–64 years old) made up 56.2% and seniors (over 64 years old) make up 26%. There were 115 people who were single and never married in the municipality.  There were 136 married individuals, 29 widows or widowers and 1 individuals who are divorced.

Also , there were 114 private households in the municipality, and an average of 2.4 persons per household. There were 35 households that consist of only one person and 10 households with five or more people. A total of 113 apartments (42.0% of the total) were permanently occupied, while 133 apartments (49.4%) were seasonally occupied and 23 apartments (8.6%) were empty. , the construction rate of new housing units was 12.7 new units per 1000 residents. The vacancy rate for the municipality, was 1.98%.

The historical population is given in the following chart:

Politics
In the 2007 federal election the most popular party was the CVP which received 74.87% of the vote.  The next three most popular parties were the SP (11.66%), the SVP (10.46%) and the FDP (1.97%).  In the federal election, a total of 182 votes were cast, and the voter turnout was 68.9%.

In the 2009 Conseil d'Etat/Staatsrat election a total of 191 votes were cast, of which 13 or about 6.8% were invalid.  The voter participation was 80.3%, which is much more than the cantonal average of 54.67%. In the 2007 Swiss Council of States election a total of 179 votes were cast, of which 11 or about 6.1% were invalid.  The voter participation was 70.5%, which is much more than the cantonal average of 59.88%.

Economy
, Blatten had an unemployment rate of 1.1%.  , there were 35 people employed in the primary economic sector and about 15 businesses involved in this sector.  2 people were employed in the secondary sector and there was 1 business in this sector.  82 people were employed in the tertiary sector, with 16 businesses in this sector. There were 127 residents of the municipality who were employed in some capacity, of which females made up 30.7% of the workforce.

 the total number of full-time equivalent jobs was 74.  The number of jobs in the primary sector was 14, all of which were in agriculture.  The number of jobs in the secondary sector was 2, all of which were in manufacturing.  The number of jobs in the tertiary sector was 58.  In the tertiary sector; 6 or 10.3% were in wholesale or retail sales or the repair of motor vehicles, 1 was in the movement and storage of goods, 43 or 74.1% were in a hotel or restaurant and 1 was the insurance or financial industry.

, there were 11 workers who commuted into the municipality and 81 workers who commuted away.  The municipality is a net exporter of workers, with about 7.4 workers leaving the municipality for every one entering. Of the working population, 22% used public transportation to get to work, and 48% used a private car.

Transport
Blatten lies on the road up the Lötschental valley from Steg and Goppenstein. The road passes through Blatten village and reaches its end at Fafleralp. A PostAuto bus service runs along the road as far as Fafleralp, connecting the settlements within the municipality to Goppenstein railway station, with some buses continuing to Steg.

Religion
Two people (or about 0.71% of the population) belonged to no church, or were agnostic or atheist, and 3 individuals (or about 1.07% of the population) did not answer the question.

Education
In Blatten about 101 (or 35.9%) of the population have completed non-mandatory upper secondary education, and 7 (or 2.5%) have completed additional higher education (either university or a Fachhochschule).  Of the 7 who completed tertiary schooling, all were Swiss men.  , there were 26 students from Blatten who attended schools outside the municipality.

Climate
According to the Köppen Climate Classification system, Blatten has a Tundra climate, abbreviated "ET" on climate maps.

References

External links

 

Municipalities of Valais
Ski areas and resorts in Switzerland